Caldilinea is a genus of bacteria from the family of Caldilineaceae.

References

Further reading 
 
 

Chloroflexota
Bacteria genera